Pine Lake Preparatory (PLP) is a public charter school located in Mooresville, North Carolina, educating students in grades K–12. PLP was founded in 2006 and started with Kindergarten, first, and second grades, and opened its doors to 1,300 students
 PLP's Upper School students (grades 9–12) choose a fine arts discipline (orchestra, band, visual art, theatre, or chorus) to study for their four years. In addition to the three schools, the campus includes a Fine Arts Building, Athletic and Community Center, and Science, Engineering, Technology and Math building, The school completed construction of a Grey and Navy blue turf football field in 2015. Students also must study Spanish every year, and the school offered an optional Spanish immersion program in Fall 2015.

Enrollment 
Pine Lake Preparatory's students come from all over the Lake Norman area and beyond. Most families live in Iredell or Mecklenburg Counties. Like other area charter schools, PLP holds a public lottery each year for available spots.

Education 
The college preparatory curriculum is rigorous. Students write a research paper in their junior year focused on a career interest, and follow up with a comprehensive project senior year. Because of the school's smaller size, students may participate in numerous athletic, civic, and other clubs and teams. Pine Lake has a graduation rate of +95% with students being admitted to universities including North Carolina State University, IE Law School of Madrid, UNC Chapel Hill, Colorado School of Mines, Duke, Clemson, M.I.T., and Vanderbilt.

References

External links 
 School website (edited by students in webcomm)

Charter schools in North Carolina
Schools in Iredell County, North Carolina
Public high schools in North Carolina
Public middle schools in North Carolina
Public elementary schools in North Carolina